DeSean or Desean is a given name. People with the name include:

DeSean Jackson (born 1986), American football player
Desean Terry, American actor
Kentrell DeSean Gaulden, better known as YoungBoy Never Broke Again, American rapper
Andre DeSean Wicker, better known as Dresta, American rapper

See also
"Te Desean", a song by Mexican singer Luis Miguel
Deshun

Masculine given names